The 2022 George Mason Patriots baseball team represented George Mason University during the 2022 NCAA Division I baseball season. The Patriots played their home games at Spuhler Field as a member of the Atlantic 10 Conference. They were led by head coach Bill Brown, in his 41st season at Mason. 

George Mason finished the season with a 22–33 record and a 13–11 record in Atlantic 10 play. They earned a berth into the 2022 Atlantic 10 Conference baseball tournament, where they were eliminated in game 8 by Richmond.

Previous season

The 2021 team finished the season with a 14–29 (7–17 Atlantic 10) record, and finished in last place in the South Division of the Atlantic 10. They did not earn a berth into the 2021 Atlantic 10 Conference baseball tournament nor the 2021 NCAA Division I baseball tournament.

Preseason

Coaches poll 
The Atlantic 10 baseball coaches' poll was released on February 15, 2022. George Mason was picked to finish tenth in the Atlantic 10.

Personnel

Roster

Game log

Tournaments

Atlantic 10 tournament

Rankings

References

External links 
 GMU Baseball

George Mason Patriots
George Mason Patriots baseball seasons
George Mason Patriots baseball